Chattaniki Kallu Levu is a 1981 Indian Telugu-language film directed by S. A. Chandrasekhar. The film stars Chiranjeevi, Madhavi, Lakshmi, Hema Sundar and Kannada Prabhakar in important roles. It is a remake of the 1981 Tamil film Sattam Oru Iruttarai. The film was released on 30 October 1981 and became a commercial success.

Plot 
Siblings Vijay (Chiranjeevi) and Durga (Lakshmi) are in pursuit of their sister's and father's murderers. Their father and sister were killed by three men, John (Hema Sundar), Javed (Kannada Prabhakar) and Janardan (Ceylon Manohar). Durga, now a police officer, wants the murderers to be punished legally. But, Vijay thinks that law and its loopholes can never track down the three murderers. So, he decides to track them down by himself and succeeds in killing John and Janardhan. This frustrates his sister and interrupts her investigations. She suspects Vijay, but due to lack of evidence remains helpless. In the end, Durga, trying to nab Javed, is kidnapped by him, but Vijay saves her and kills Javed.

Cast 

Chiranjeevi as Vijay
Madhavi as Rekha
Lakshmi as Inspector Durga
Suhasini
Nalini
Hema Sundar as John
Kannada Prabhakar
Prabhakar Reddy
Narayana Rao
Mada Venkateswara Rao

References

External links 

1980s action drama films
1980s Telugu-language films
1980s vigilante films
1981 films
Films directed by S. A. Chandrasekhar
Indian action drama films
Indian films about revenge
Indian vigilante films
Telugu remakes of Tamil films